Arthur John Wood (7 February 1892 – 1 March 1951) was an English cricketer who played for Derbyshire between 1911 and 1912.

Personal life and career
Wood was born in Derby  and was educated at Denstone College, playing for the old boys team in later years. He debuted for Derbyshire against Leicestershire in July 1911 when he made 51 in his first innings. He played five games that season in the County Championship and made his second half-century and his highest total of 52 against Nottinghamshire.

In 1912 he played a full season of matches, but only achieved a top score of 25. Wood was a right-handed batsman and played 19 innings in 13 first-class matches with an average of 14.66 and a top score of 52. He was a right-arm medium-fast bowler but took no wickets in the twelve overs he bowled.

Wood died in Norwood, Surrey at the age of 59.

References

1892 births
1951 deaths
English cricketers
Derbyshire cricketers
Cricketers from Derby